Susan McLean is an American poet, a translator of poetry, and a retired professor of English at Southwest Minnesota State University in Marshall, Minnesota.

She graduated from Harvard University with a BA in English in 1975 and from Rutgers University with a PhD in 1990. Her work has appeared in Kalliope, Atlanta Review, The Formalist, Iambs and Trochees, Arion, Measure, The Classical Outlook, Literary Imagination. She writes in the field of formalism. According to an interview with the Poetry Foundation, she describes her love of formalism as: " I am addicted to the esoteric pleasures of rhyme and meter, and I don’t even try to deny it or camouflage it with slant rhyme". She has been portrayed as a New Formalist by many if not most noted critics of her work.

Awards
2015 Finalist, PEN Center USA Translation Award
2014 Donald Justice Poetry Prize
2009 Richard Wilbur Award
2006 the Leslie Mellichamp Prize from The Lyric
2004 McKnight Artist Fellowship/Loft Award in Poetry

Works
"Deep Cover"; "Desire"; "Hazard", Mezzo Cammin
"Translations of Latin epigrams by Martial", The Chimaera, January 2008
"Vanity: On a painting by Frank Cadogan Cowper", Eratosphere
"Unscripted"; "Raw", Umbrella, Issue 2, 2007
 Translator, Martial, Selected Epigrams, University of Wisconsin Press, 2014, 
 The Whetstone Misses the Knife, Story Line Press, 2014, 
 The Best Disguise, University of Evansville Press, 2009, 
 Holding Patterns, Finishing Line Press, 2006,

Anthologies
 Currents of the Universal Being: Explorations in the Literature of Energy, Texas Tech University Press, 2015, 
 Irresistible Sonnets, Headmistress Press, 2014, 
 Villanelles, Everyman's Library, 2012, 
 The Best of The Barefoot Muse, Barefoot Muse Press, 2011, 
 The Cento: A Collection of Collage Poems, Red Hen Press, 2011, 
 Hot Sonnets, Entasis Press, 2011, 
 Kiss and Part: Laughing at the End of Romance and Other Entanglements, Doggerel Daze Press, 2005, 
 Sonnets: 150 Contemporary Sonnets University of Evansville Press, 2005,

References

Rutgers University alumni
Southwest Minnesota State University faculty
Living people
Year of birth missing (living people)
American women poets
Formalism (aesthetics)
Harvard University alumni
American women academics
21st-century American women